The 2012 Big League World Series took place from July 25-August 1 in Easley, South Carolina, United States. San Juan,  Puerto Rico defeated Easley, South Carolina in the championship game.

Teams

Results

United States Group

International Group

Elimination Round

References

Big League World Series
Big League World Series